Alf Nordvang (15 December 1931 – 11 June 2007) was a Norwegian actor and theatre director.

He was born in Bærum. He made his stage debut at Det Norske Teatret in 1954, was hired at Falkbergets Teater in the same year and Rogaland Teater in 1957. He was the director of Rogaland Teater from 1982 to 1986 and 1990 to 1991.

External links

References

1931 births
2007 deaths
Norwegian male stage actors
Norwegian male film actors
Norwegian theatre directors
People from Bærum